Albarello is an Italian surname. Notable people with the surname include:

 Marco Albarello (born 1960), Italian cross-country skier
 Yves Albarello (born 1952), French politician

See also
 Albarelli
 Albarello (disambiguation)

Italian-language surnames